Goodbye Casanova was a 2000 fantasy-romance film directed by Mauro Borrelli, starring Yasmine Bleeth, Paul Ganus, Gian-Carlo Scandiuzzi and Flea (the bassist from Red Hot Chili Peppers).

Plot
Robert is an aspiring novelist who operates a tiny neighborhood bookstore. Claudia is his wife and a talented painter.  Robert and Claudia's marriage is disintegrating, and they are about to sign their divorce papers.

Meanwhile, the legendary Casanova and his lover Lavinia are characters trapped inside of a 17th-century children's book. The tragedy of the impending divorce triggers the release of Casanova and Lavinia from the confines of the children's pop-up book.

Cast
Yasmine Bleeth as Lavinia
Carmen Filpi as Festus
Pamela Gidley as Hilly
Flea as Silent
Gian-Carlo Scandiuzzi as Giacomo Casanova
Ellen Bradley as Claudia
Paul Ganus as Robert
Mario Opinato as Italian singer (voice)

Awards
Goodbye Casanova won the Audience Award at the Los Angeles Italian Film Awards for the director, Mauro Borrelli, in 2000.

The film also won the Feature Film Award for Best Set Design and the award for Best Art Direction for director, Mauro Borelli, at the New York International Independent Film & Video Festival in the Spring of 2001.

External links
 
Goodbye Casanova information
Goodbye Casanova press release information
Goodbye Casanova background information

2000 directorial debut films
2000 films
2000 romantic drama films
American television films
Films scored by Marco Beltrami
Films about Giacomo Casanova
Cultural depictions of Giacomo Casanova
2000s English-language films
Films directed by Mauro Borrelli